Big Bend generally refers to a major change in course or large meander in a river. It may refer to:

Geographic locations

Canada
 Columbia River in British Columbia
 Big Bend Country
 Big Bend Ranges, the mountain ranges surrounded by the Big Bend

United States
 Big Bend (Florida), part of the Florida Panhandle
 Big Bend Historical Area (Shenango River), in western Pennsylvania
 Big Bend (Texas) (Rio Grande), in western Texas
 Big Bend National Park, in Texas
 Big Bend (Colorado River, Utah), a meander
 Big Bend (Missouri River), a meander in South Dakota
 Big Bend of the Columbia River, a wide curve near Wenatchee, Washington

Inhabited places

Australia
 Big Bend, South Australia

Canada
 Big Bend, British Columbia, now inundated by Kinbasket Lake

Eswatini 
 Big Bend, Eswatini

United States
 Big Bend, California (Pit River), a census-designated place
 Big Bend Rancheria
 Big Bend, Butte County, California, an unincorporated community
 Big Bend, Placer County, California, an unincorporated community
 Big Bend, Louisiana, an unincorporated community
 Big Bend City, Minnesota
 Bigbend, West Virginia
 Big Bend, Rusk County, Wisconsin, a town
 Big Bend, Waukesha County, Wisconsin, a village

Other uses 
 The Big Bend, a proposed residential skyscraper in New York City
 Big Bend Community College, in Moses Lake, Washington, United States
 Big Bend Dam, on the Missouri River in South Dakota, United States
 Big Bend Gold Rush of the 1860s in British Columbia, Canada
 Big Bend High School, in Terlingua, Texas, United States
 Big Bend slider, a species of turtle.

See also 
 Big Bend State Park (disambiguation)